Kennedy v. Louisiana, 554 U.S. 407 (2008), is a landmark decision by the Supreme Court of the United States that held that the Eighth Amendment's Cruel and Unusual Punishments Clause prohibits imposing the death penalty for a crime where the victim did not die.

Background

Patrick O'Neal Kennedy (born December 13, 1964), a man from Harvey, Louisiana in Greater New Orleans, was sentenced to death after being convicted of raping and sodomizing his eight-year-old stepdaughter. The rape, taking place in March 1998, was uncommonly brutal: it tore the victim's perineum "from her vaginal opening to her anal opening. [It] tore her vagina on the interior such that it separated partially from her cervix and allowed her rectum to protrude into her vagina. Invasive emergency surgery was required to repair these injuries." Kennedy maintained that the battery was committed by two neighborhood boys, and refused to plead guilty when a deal was offered to spare him from a death sentence. Nevertheless, he was convicted in 2003 and sentenced under a 1995 Louisiana law that allowed the death penalty for the rape of a child under the age of 12.

On appeal, Kennedy challenged the constitutionality of executing a person solely for child rape, and the Louisiana Supreme Court rejected the challenge on the grounds that the death penalty was not too harsh for such a heinous offense. The court distinguished the U.S. Supreme Court's plurality decision in Coker v. Georgia (1977), concluding that Coker'''s rejection of death as punishment for rape of an adult woman did not apply when the victim was a child. Rather, the Louisiana Supreme Court applied a balancing test set out by the U.S. Supreme Court in more recent death penalty cases, Atkins v. Virginia and Roper v. Simmons, first examining whether there is a national consensus on the punishment and then considering whether the court would find the punishment excessive. The Louisiana Supreme Court concluded that the adoption of similar laws in five other states, coupled with the unique vulnerability of children, satisfied Atkins and Roper.

Kennedy was one of two men in the country under sentence of death for a crime other than murder; the other, Richard L. Davis, had been sentenced under the same Louisiana law. Kennedy sought direct review of the Louisiana Supreme Court's decision in the Supreme Court of the United States, which agreed to hear the case in January 2008.

Argument
In seeking certiorari to the U.S. Supreme Court, Jeffrey L. Fisher, a Stanford Law School professor appealing on behalf of Kennedy, argued that five states do not constitute a "national consensus" for the purposes of Eighth Amendment analysis, that Coker v. Georgia should apply to all rapes regardless of the age of the victim, and that the law was unfair in its application, singling out black child rapists for death at a significantly higher rate than whites. Certiorari to the defendant was granted on January 4, 2008.

The case pitted the Eighth Amendment definition of "cruel and unusual punishment" against states' rights as defined in the Tenth Amendment, with the issue being whether states may constitutionally impose the death penalty for any crime other than murder as a principle of a state's right to impose punishment as it saw fit, under the Tenth Amendment, and, in particular, whether a death sentence is a disproportionate penalty, under the Eighth Amendment, for raping a child. No person has been executed in the United States for rape since 1964.

Jefferson Parish, Louisiana assistant district attorney Juliet L. Clark argued for the State of Louisiana and Texas Solicitor General Ted Cruz argued for the State of Texas and other amicus curiae states.

Questions presented
Does the Eighth Amendment's Cruel and Unusual Punishment Clause permit a State to use the death penalty to punish the crime of rape of a child?
If so, does Louisiana's capital rape statute violate the Eighth Amendment insofar as it fails genuinely to narrow the class of such offenders eligible for the death penalty?

Opinion of the Supreme Court

Majority
On June 25, 2008, the Supreme Court, splitting 5–4, held that "the Eighth Amendment bars Louisiana from imposing the death penalty for the rape of a child where the crime did not result, and was not intended to result, in the victim's death." In its majority opinion authored by Justice Kennedy, the Court explained that the application of the death penalty had to rest on national consensus, and that as only six States permitted the death penalty for child rape, no such consensus existed. "Unlike Louisiana, those states all require that a defendant have a previous rape conviction or some other aggravating factor in order to be subject to the death penalty, and no one has yet been sentenced to death under any of the laws." In formulating the idea of "national consensus" the Court relied on the previous cases Roper v. Simmons (2005), which outlawed the execution of minors, and Coker v. Georgia (1977), which outlawed the application of the death penalty for the crime of rape. According to the Court, "[t]he death penalty is not a proportional punishment for the rape of a child." The opinion, which was joined by the court's four more liberal judges, went on to state, "The court concludes that there is a distinction between intentional first-degree murder, on the one hand, and non-homicide crimes against individuals, even including child rape, on the other. The latter crimes may be devastating in their harm, as here, but in terms of moral depravity and of the injury to the person and to the public, they cannot compare to murder in their severity and irrevocability." The opinion concluded that in cases of crimes against individuals, "the death penalty should not be expanded to instances where the victim's life was not taken".

The majority opinion left open the possibility of the death penalty for "drug kingpin activity", as well as treason, espionage and terrorism, these being considered crimes against "the State" rather than against "individual persons":

Dissent
In his dissent, Justice Alito sharply criticized the majority for usurping the role of the legislature. Alito argued that Kennedy's rationale for defining national consensus was flawed, because the previous Coker decision had "stunted legislative consideration of the question whether the death penalty for the targeted offense of raping a young child is consistent with prevailing standards of decency." In this Alito followed former Chief Justice Warren Burger, who had dissented from Coker because it, in his view, prevented a full debate over the uses of the recently reinstated death penalty. In this vein, Alito also argued that "The Eighth Amendment protects the right of an accused. It does not authorize this Court to strike down federal or state criminal laws on the ground that they are not in the best interests of crime victims or the broader society."

Factual error
A central point of the court's analysis was the observation that child rape was a capital offense in only six states, and that no other state, nor any federal jurisdiction, authorized the death penalty for that crime.

Three days after the case was decided, Dwight Sullivan, a colonel in the United States Marine Corps Reserve who was the Chief Defense Counsel for the Office of Military Commissions, noted in his CAAFlog on military justice that Congress had revised the Uniform Code of Military Justice in 2006 to add child rape to the list of offenses punishable in the military by death. None of the 10 briefs filed with the Court, and neither the majority nor dissent, mentioned the provision. On July 2, 2008, Linda Greenhouse of The New York Times highlighted Sullivan's post, bringing the issue to national attention.

After the error was discovered, supporters of the law—including the governors of Missouri and Louisiana, and 85 members of Congress—petitioned for rehearing. The United States Department of Justice also filed a brief supporting rehearing. It noted that it too had missed the 2006 amendment; since it has a duty to defend all federal laws, and since the decision called that law into question, it was duty-bound to favor rehearing.

The court requested briefs from both the state and the defense on the matter with the possibility of amending the ruling. On October 1, 2008, however, the Supreme Court decided 7–2 not to revisit its decision. In addition to the majority of five in the original case, Scalia and Roberts also filed a concurrence, writing that "the views of the American people on the death penalty for child rape were, to tell the truth, irrelevant to the majority's decision in this case ... and there is no reason to believe that absence of a national consensus would provoke second thoughts." Only Thomas and Alito voted for the rehearing.

Reactions
The decision was handed down in the run-up to a presidential election and both the Democratic and Republican presidential candidates, Barack Obama and John McCain, criticized the majority opinion.

Barack Obama said at a news conference in Chicago:

Obama also argued that the high court had gone too far in restricting the powers of the states. If the court had "said we want to constrain the abilities of states to do this to make sure that it's done in a careful and appropriate way, that would have been one thing. But it basically had a blanket prohibition and I disagree with that decision."

John McCain responded to the ruling by calling it:

In January 2009, U.S. Senator for Louisiana David Vitter introduced S. Res. 4, "A resolution expressing the sense of the Senate that the Supreme Court of the United States erroneously decided Kennedy v. Louisiana, No. 07-343 (2008), and that the eighth amendment to the Constitution of the United States allows the imposition of the death penalty for the rape of a child." This resolution was never voted upon by the full Senate and died in committee when the 111th Congress adjourned.

During his 2012 campaign for a Texas Senate seat, Ted Cruz was criticized for not including the military case law in his brief to the Supreme Court. Cruz responded stating that the oversight did not affect the ruling as Louisiana raised the issue when it requested a rehearing, which was denied.

Aftermath
Since the Supreme Court decision set aside the death sentence, the Louisiana Supreme Court remanded the case back to the district court for resentencing. After a brief hearing, Kennedy was sentenced to life imprisonment without the possibility of parole on January 7, 2009, which was the mandatory sentence for the crime.

 See also 

 List of United States Supreme Court cases
 List of United States Supreme Court cases, volume 554
 Ford v. Wainwright (1986), interdicted death sentences for those who qualify as mentally insane
 Thompson v. Oklahoma (1988), outlawed the death penalty for anyone under 16
 Payne v. Tennessee (1991), recognized testimony concerning emotional distress of victims' families as non-violative of the Eighth Amendment, thereby reversing previous rulings including South Carolina v. Gathers Graham v. Florida (2010), declared life incarceration without the possibility of parole a "cruel and unusual" sentence for non-murder crimes by minors
 Miller v. Alabama (2012), superseded Graham'' by proscribing life incarceration without parole outright for crimes committed when a defendant was under 18

References

External links
 
 Sex Crimes: Patrick Kennedy v. Louisiana Resource Page: Contains Merits/Amicus Briefs & Media Links
 U.S. Supreme Court Argument Transcript
 Legal Information Institute Bulletin: Cornell University Law School - Kennedy v. Louisiana (07-343)

Capital punishment in Louisiana
Cruel and Unusual Punishment Clause and death penalty case law
Legal history of Louisiana
Jefferson Parish, Louisiana
Rape in the United States
United States Supreme Court cases
United States Supreme Court cases of the Roberts Court
2008 in Louisiana
2008 in United States case law
American people convicted of rape